The qualification round of  Men's 50 metre rifle prone event started  at morning of  28 July 2014 at the Barry Buddon Shooting Centre, while the final was also  held in the evening   at the same place.

Results

Qualification

Final

References

External links
Schedule

Shooting at the 2014 Commonwealth Games